Mihkel Oviir (born 11 October 1942 in Märjamaa) is an Estonian lawyer.

In 1975, he graduated from Tartu University's Faculty of Law.

Before 2003, he worked almost 30 years at Ministry of Justice, being on different posts.

2003–2013, he was Auditor General of Estonia.

References

Living people
1942 births
20th-century Estonian lawyers
21st-century Estonian lawyers